is a series of Japanese romance visual novel video games released by KID. The first game in the series, simply called Memories Off, was released in 1999 for the PlayStation. Memories Off titles have been released on the PC as well as video and handheld gaming consoles such as the PlayStation 2, Dreamcast, WonderSwan Color, and the PlayStation Portable. Several of the series' games' story have been adapted into original video animations, novels, or manga.

With the bankruptcy of KID in 2006, the development of Memories Off #5: Encore was cancelled. It also marked a temporary halt to any development of the game series. However, after Cyberfront took over the brand, development resumed and Memories Off #5: Encore was released on July 12, 2007. However, 5pb. Games has acquired exclusive rights of the series from Cyberfront and all future development of the series will be handled by 5pb. Games.

Gameplay
The gameplay of Memories Off follows the style of most visual novels; the majority of time spent playing the game is spent on reading through the dialogue or story that appears on screen. Every so often, the game will pause and the player is given a chance to choose from two to five options regarding how he or she wishes to advance the game. The plot will then branch into paths focusing on a single heroine depending on the choices that were made by the player; a conclusive character ending will be presented at the end of any given path. Starting from Memories Off 2nd, all main series games offer the possibility of multiple endings for each of the heroines. Hence, in order to experience the game and all of the main plotlines in their entirety, the player will have to replay the game multiple times and make difference choices to further the plot in alternative directions. Some of the Memories Off games may also contain a hidden "True" plotline that is only made available to the player after all of the other main plotlines are completed.

Voice acting is usually present during all key points of the games, and all main series games from Memories Off 2nd onward have had full voice acting. Environments and objects in game are also generally non-interactive and non-free-roaming, but some background animations have been added to the series, starting with You That Become A Memory ~Memories Off~, in order to enhance the visual experience.

Games
The first installment of the series was released in Japan on September 30, 1999. Subsequent titles were tied together based on the ending of a specific route from the previous installment. Since the game's original release, many Memories Off games have been localized for the Chinese and Korean-speaking markets as well as being ported on multiple video game consoles, handhelds, and the PC. , there are 17 games in the series. This number includes the main series as well as direct prequels and sequels and spin-offs. The first seven games in the main series are planned for release across two collections titled Memories Off Historia Vol. 1 and Vol. 2, with four and three games included respectively, on March 25, 2021 for the Nintendo Switch and PlayStation 4 consoles.

Main series
Memories Off (PS: 1999, PC: 2000, DC: 2000, PS2: 2002, PSP: 2008, iPhone: 2009)
Memories Off 2nd (PS: 2000, DC: 2001, PC: 2002, PSP: 2008, iPhone: 2010)
Omoide ni Kawaru Kimi: Memories Off (PS2: 2002, DC: 2002, PC: 2004, PSP: 2008, iPhone: 2010)
 (PS2: 2004, PC: 2004, PSP: 2008)
 (PS2: 2005, PC: 2007, PSP: 2009)
Memories Off 6: T-wave (PS2: 2008, PSP, 360: 2009, iPhone: 2010, PS3, PSV: 2013)
Memories Off: Yubikiri no Kioku (360: 2010, PSP: 2011, PS3, PSV: 2013)
Memories Off: Innocent Fille (PS4, PSV, PC, Switch: 2018)

Direct prequels, sequels, and spin-offs
Memories Off Pure (NGP: 2000) – Prequel to Memories Off
Memories Off Festa (WSC: 2001)
Memories Off Duet (PS2: 2003, PC: 2008) – A compilation of Memories Off and Memories Off 2nd, includes additional prequel story  
Memories Off Mix (PS2: 2003)
Memories Off After Rain Vol. 1~3 (PS2: 2005, PC: 2008, PSP: 2009) – After stories to Memories Off and Memories Off 2nd.
 (PS2: 2006)
Memories Off History (PC: 2007)
Memories Off #5 encore (PS2: 2007, PSP: 2008)
Your·Memories Off ~Girl's Style (PS2: 2008, PSP: 2009) – Currently the only game in the series that is an otome game (targeted to female gamers)
Memories Off 6: Next Relation (PS2: 2009, 360: 2009, PSP: 2010, PS3, PSV: 2013) – Sequel to Memories Off 6: T-Wave.

OVA adaptations
Memories Off
Memories Off 2nd

Notes

References

External links
Memories Off series' official website 

 
Bishōjo games
IOS games
Otome games
KID games
Dreamcast games
PlayStation (console) games
PlayStation 2 games
PlayStation 3 games
PlayStation 4 games
PlayStation Portable games
PlayStation Vita games
Visual novels
Windows games